JOTX-DTV (channel 7), branded as  and known colloquially as  or simply TX, is a television station headquartered in the Sumitomo Fudosan Roppongi Grand Tower in Roppongi, Minato, Tokyo, Japan, owned and operated by the  subsidiary of listed certified broadcasting holding company  itself a subsidiary of Nikkei, Inc., serving as the flagship station of the TX Network. It is one of the major Tokyo television stations, particularly specialising in anime.

History
It took its name from its VHF frequency channel 12. It almost went bankrupt in 1968; on 1 July that year, a limited liability company, Tokyo Channel 12 Production was established with the help of the Nikkei and Mainichi Broadcasting System.

In 1969 the Nikkei and MBS signed a memorandum of understanding which stipulates that Tokyo Channel 12 should share programs with Nihon Educational Television (NET, now TV Asahi). This forms a de facto alliance which lasts until 1975.

At the same time, the station moved to Shiba Park. A month later, it became a general purpose TV station along with NET. On April 1, 1978, Tokyo launched a new production company, Softx.

In 1981, it was again renamed, this time to Television Tokyo Channel 12, Ltd. d/b/a TV Tokyo; the current Japanese name of the company was also assumed in the same year.

In 1983, TV Tokyo formed the Mega TON  Network (now TX Network) with TV Osaka, and Aichi Television Broadcasting. The company shifted its head offices from Shiba Park to Toranomon in December 1985. On October 4, 1999, Tokyo's production company Softx was renamed to TV Tokyo MediaNet. In 2004, TV Tokyo MediaNet was shortened to MediaNet. On June 25, 2004, the company assumed its current English name of TV Tokyo Corporation. After the digital transition, the channel began broadcasting on digital channel 7. On November 7, 2016, TV Tokyo moved its headquarters to new building at Sumitomo Fudosan Roppongi Grand Tower from its old studios in Toranomon. For its broadcast of animated programs, the network originally used a Circle 7-style logo. The station mascot is a cartoon banana with eyes, a nose and a mouth which is bent into a 7, named Nanana.

The network is part of the Japan Consortium, which covers the Olympic Games and the FIFA World Cup.

Broadcasting

Digital
Call sign: JOTX-DTV
Remote controller ID 7
Tokyo Skytree: Channel 23

Analog
Analog transmission ceased on 24 July 2011.
Call sign: JOTX-TV
Tokyo Tower: Channel 12

Programming

Related companies
 TV Tokyo Holdings
 BS TV Tokyo
 TV Tokyo Production
 TV Tokyo Music
 PROTX
 AT-X
 FM Inter-Wave Inc.
 IntaracTV
 Nikkei CNBC
 TV Tokyo America Inc.
 MediaNet (formerly TV Tokyo MediaNet & Softx)
 Shogakukan-Shueisha Productions Co., Ltd. (formerly Shogakukan Productions Co., Ltd.)

See also 
 Television in Japan
 AT-X

Notes

References

External links

  - 
 Corporate Information - 
 

Anime companies
Mass media companies based in Tokyo
Companies formerly listed on the Tokyo Stock Exchange
Japanese-language television stations
Television networks in Japan
Nikkei Inc.
Mass media companies established in 1951
Television channels and stations established in 1964
Television in Tokyo
Television stations in Japan
TX Network
1951 establishments in Japan
1964 establishments in Japan
Roppongi